IFAF Asia is the governing body of American football in Asia. It is a member of the International Federation of American Football. IFAF Asia replaced the Asian Federation of American Football (AFAF) in 2012. The oldest of IFAF Asia federations is the Japan American Football Association (JAFA), which was founded in 1934.

Events
Asian Flag football Championship (Men), every two years.
Asian beach Flag football championships. (Men), every two years.
Beach flag football at the 2014 Asian Beach Games

Members

2022 Members
Asia (12)
 - 2007 
 - ?
 - 2005 
 - ?
 - 1946
 - 2011 
 - 2017 
 - 2009 
 - 2007
 - 2020 
 - ?
 - 2009

Former Countries

 (Thailand American Football Association)

References

External links
  IFAF Asia on the IFAF website

International Federation of American Football